The People's Liberation Army Air Force (PLAAF), also referred to as the Chinese Air Force or the People's Air Force, is an aerial service branch of the People's Liberation Army, the regular armed forces of the People's Republic of China. The PLAAF was officially established on 11 November 1949 and it is composed of five branches: aviation, ground-based air defense, radar, Airborne Corps and other support elements.

The PLAAF first faced combat in the Korean War against the United States using primarily the Mikoyan-Gurevich MiG-15 fighter aircraft, aircraft provided by the Soviet Union, which also assisted with the expansion of the Chinese aerospace industry. Changes in the organization of the PLAAF followed by modernization programs in the 1990s and increased technology development in the 21st century has created the J-20 stealth multirole fighter, the first of its kind for China.

History

Origins 
Today's People's Liberation Army Air Force (PLAAF) traces its roots back to September 1924 when a small group of nine cadets from the still-young Chinese Communist Party graduated from Sun Yat-sen's military flight school in Guangzhou. Having only been founded three years prior in July 1921, the Chinese Communist Party (CCP) formed a united front with the nationalist Kuomintang (KMT) party against competing warlords in a bid to reunite a fractionalized China. The eighteen graduate pilots of the military flight school, under Sun's Guangzhou Revolutionary Government Aviation Bureau, included nine nationalist and nine communist pilots who were sent to the Soviet Union for two years of advanced flight training under the tutelage of the more experienced Soviet Air Force. Two of the CCP's graduates, Chang Qiankun and Wang Bi, continued to serve in the Soviet Air Force for fourteen years until, in September 1938, they returned to Dihua (now Ürümqi) as instructors. Chang and Wang would play instrumental roles in the founding of the PLAAF.

In January 1941, as intensifying clashes between CCP and KMT forces ended the united front against invading Japanese forces, and despite having neither aircraft nor airfields, the CCP's Central Military Commission (CMC) established the Air Force Engineering School with Wang as commandant and Chang as head instructor. In May of 1944, just over a year before the Japanese surrender to Allied forces, the CMC established an Aviation Section in Yan'an with Wang as its director and Chang as deputy director. Two years later in May 1946 and after the withdrawal of Japanese troops, the CMC established the Northeast Old Aviation School in Jilin. By 1949 the Aviation Section of the CMC had 560 trained personnel (125 pilots and 435 ground support specialists), purchased 435 aircraft from the Soviet Union, acquired 115 Nationalist aircraft, and operated seven military flight schools.

Founding 
The first organized air unit of the People's Liberation Army was formed in July 1949 at Beijing Nanyuan Airport (built and first operated under the Qing Dynasty) and operated American P-51 Mustangs, PT-19s, and British DH.98 Mosquitos. The squadron had acquired the Western-made aircraft once donated to the KMT for use against the Japanese, through a series of airfield captures and nationalist defections.

In March of 1949, the CMC elevated its Aviation Section to the shortly-lived Aviation Bureau with Chang and Wang appointed as the bureau's director and political commissar, respectively. On 1 October 1949, the victorious communist forces established the People's Republic of China and, on 11 November 1949, the CMC dissolved its Aviation Section founding instead the People's Liberation Army Air Force. Initially manned by a variety of units from ground forces, the new PLAAF organized its headquarters (PLAAF HQ) in Beijing and organized administrative aviation divisions for each of the PLA's six military regions, later to each be named a Military Region Air Force (MRAF). The new organization, which was not yet seen as a service separate from the army, was headed by ground force commander Li Yalou with Xiao Hua (former ground force commander and political commissar) as the PLAAF's first political commissar. Chang was appointed as a PLAAF deputy commander and as director of the PLAAF's Training Department while Wang was named deputy political commissar and director of the Aeronautical Engineering Department.

In June of 1950, the first PLAAF aviation unit, the 4th Composite Air Brigade was established in Nanjing based on the 30th Army's 90th Division and commanding the 10th, 11th and 12th Air Regiments. In the same year, the PLAAF created the 2nd and 3rd Composite Air Brigades. Although the 4th Composite Air Brigade would be renamed in 1950 to the PLAAF 4th Air Division, it would become the 1st Air Division in 1956 with the 2nd and 3rd Composite Air Brigades becoming the 2nd and 3rd Air Divisions, respectively.

Korean War to the Sino-Soviet Split 

The PLAAF expanded rapidly during the Korean War. Two brigades were created in 1950, but disbanded in the early 1950s and replaced by division; both had subordinate regiments. During the war, 26 divisions and a smaller number of independent regiments and schools were created by personnel transfers from the army; the air force inherited the army's organization and was commanded by army officers. By early 1954, there were 28 divisions, with 70 regiments, and five independent regiments operating 3000 aircraft. The Soviets provided Mikoyan-Gurevich MiG-15 aircraft (J-2 in Chinese service), training, and support for developing the domestic aviation industry. Shenyang Aircraft Corporation built the two-seat MiG-15UTI trainer as the JJ-2, and during the war manufactured various components to maintain the Soviet-built fighters. By 1956 the People's Republic was assembling licensed copies of MiG-15s and eight years later was producing both the Shenyang J-5 (MiG-17) and the Shenyang J-6 (MiG-19) under license.

The PLAAF emerged from the war as an air defense force. The main role was to support the army by achieving air superiority using fighters, radar, and ground-based weapons. This was reinforced through the 1950s and 1960s when the PLAAF's main activities were skirmishing with the Republic of China Air Force near the Taiwan Strait, and intercepting American aircraft. The PLAAF was passive in applying offensive airpower due to the limited range of capabilities and political considerations. PLAAF was used as a deterrence due to the political culture at the time. The Chinese leadership, in many instances, would cancel offensive bombing missions to prevent escalation, affecting the decision-making autonomy of the PLAAF.

In 1960, Soviet engineers and advisors left China due to the Sino-Soviet split; although the Soviet Union granted licensed rights to MiG-15, MiG-17, MiG-19, MiG-21, Il-28, and Tu-16, China didn't retain the technical material or machinery as the Soviet advisory withdrew. China had to reverse-engineer aircraft and missile systems to set up production lines. Internal political and economic chaos from the Cultural Revolution, the Great Leap Forward severely impacted the modernization and development of the PLAAF.

The prioritization of the missile and nuclear weapon programs also removed necessary resources from the aviation industry, which markedly declined through 1963. PLAAAF as a whole stagnated, in metrics such as flight safety, pilot education, training, and strategic planning. However, flight hours recovered around 1965 as China started to support North Vietnam and was involved in the Vietnam War. Due to difficult conditions, the accident rates raised from 0.249 to 0.6 per 10,000 sorties in 1965.

Between January 1954 and 1971, 22 divisions were created for a total of 50.

1970s to 1980s
In the 1970s, the Culture Revolution (1966-1976) continued to damage the PLAAF readiness, leading to devastating impacts on pilot training, maintenance operation, and logistics. All PLAAF technical and maintenance schools were closed for a prolonged time, halting nearly every activity besides pilot flights. Moreover, the Chinese aviation industrial base was vandalized heavily due to the political turmoil, with many aircraft development programs stretched out, and the quality control in factories wasn't sustained due to disruptions caused by Red Guards. Political fallouts from the Culture Revolution could still be felt by the leadership, and recovery only began in the 1980s.

PLAAF leadership recognized the importance of modern airpower and the existing weakness of the force in the late 1980s. After critical assessments, the 1985 reform led to force reduction, reorganization, and streamlining. Before the 1985 reorganization, the Air Force reportedly had four branches: air defense, ground attack, bombing, and independent air regiments. In peacetime the Air Force Directorate, under the supervision of the PLA General Staff Department, controlled the Air Force through headquarters located with, or in communication with, each of the seven military region headquarters. In war, control of the Air Force probably reverted to the regional commanders. In 1987 it was not clear how the reorganization and the incorporation of air support elements into the group armies affected air force organization. The largest Air Force organizational unit was the division, which consisted of 17,000 personnel in three regiments. A typical air defense regiment had three squadrons of three flights; each flight had three or four aircraft. The Air Force also had 220,000 air defense personnel who controlled about 100 surface-to-air missile sites and over 16,000 AA guns. In addition, it had a large number of early-warning, ground-control-intercept, and air-base radars operated by specialized troops organized into at least twenty-two independent regiments.

In the 1980s, the Air Force made serious efforts to raise the educational level and improve the training of its pilots. Superannuated pilots were retired or assigned to other duties. All new pilots were at least middle-school graduates. The time it took to train a qualified pilot capable of performing combat missions reportedly was reduced from four or five years to two years. The training emphasized raising technical and tactical skills in individual pilots and participation in combined-arms operations. Flight safety also increased.

From 1986 to 1988, each military region converted a division into a division-level transition training base (改装训练基地), which replaced training regiments in operational divisions.

In 1987 the Air Force had serious technological deficiencies — especially when compared with its principal threat, the Soviet Armed Forces — and had many needs that it could not satisfy. It needed more advanced aircraft, better avionics, electronic countermeasures equipment, more powerful aircraft weaponry, a low-altitude surface-to-air missile, and better controlled antiaircraft artillery guns. Some progress was made in aircraft design with the incorporation of Western avionics into the Chengdu J-7 and Shenyang J-8, the development of refueling capabilities for the B-6D bomber and the A-5 attack fighter, increased aircraft all-weather capabilities, and the production of the HQ-2J high-altitude surface-to-air missile and the C-601 air-to-ship missile.

Although the PLAAF received significant support from Western nations in the 1980s when China was seen as a counterweight to Soviet power, this support ended in 1989 as a result of the Chinese crackdown on the Tiananmen protests of 1989 and the later collapse of the Soviet Union in 1991.  After the fall of the USSR, the Russian Federation became China's principal arms supplier, to the extent that Chinese economic growth allowed Russia to sustain its aerospace industry.

1990s to 2000s

In the late 1980s and early 1990s, PLAAF still remained a large yet antiqued force. As of 1995, the air force consisted of approximately 4,500 combat aircraft based on the 1950s and 1960s technologies, which were approaching the end of their service life. The overall force strategy is defensive, with the primary objectives limited to protecting cities, airbases, economic and industrial centers, and important institutions and facilities. The air fleet continued to shrink, with RAND Corporation predicting PLAAF being halved by the early 2000s. PLAAF leadership also lacked strategic options, given the severe constraints in China's budgets, manpower, and technology at the time. The force lacked joint operation capabilities, had no combat experience since 1979, and lacked command and control infrastructure to support offensive operations beyond the Chinese borders. The Chinese aviation industrial base was inadequate and weak, and China lacked the capacity to produce modern avionics, composites, turbofan engines, and integrated systems.

Despite the difficulties, PLAAF was determined to introduce modern airpower and secure technological self-sufficiency. The air force inducted Sukhoi Su-27, the most sophisticated fighter Soviets had at the time. The sales were approved in December 1990, with three fighters delivered to China before the disintegration of the Soviet Union in 1991. Contract with Soviet Union and later Russia also included manufacture license for China to build the Su-27 domestically, which helped Chinese aviation industry to accumulate know-how and experience. Other technology transfer and license agreements were also signed between China and countries such as Russia, France, Israel, which allowed Chinese access to many state-of-the-art technologies. China and Western countries also made several attempted to modernize the aging Chinese fleet in the form of Peace Pearl program and Chengdu Super 7. However, the political fallout from the 1989 Tiananmen Square protests terminated some of these efforts.

In the early 1990s, PLAAF continued to invest in domestic aircraft programs, including the J-10, the Project Sabre II, and the Sino-Pakistani FC-1. However, the concerns over the US possible intervention during Taiwan independence scenario in 1992 to 1993 pressurized PLAAF to build near-term combat capability by prioritizing procurement of foreign platforms, which led to the further induction of platforms such as Sukhoi Su-30 and S-300 PMU-1. 

At the same time, PLAAF leadership advocated for more active roles in the Chinese military but was sidelined by the PLA headquarters due to concerns over political reliability and a general lack of capabilities. PLAAF continued persuasive efforts, and their plans were eventually endorsed by the PLA leadership in the late 1990s and early 2000s. In 1999, PLAAF set up a combined arms training base to conduct multi-force joint operations. In 2003, PLAAF began structural reforms and reduced the number of personnel by 200,000 (85% were officials), freeing up resources for the force overhaul. The leadership was consolidated to become more operationally efficient. Three dedicated training bases were established to provide research, testing, training, and combat support. In 2004, PLAAF released the force reform concept "Strategic Air Force", aiming to reconstruct the PLAAF into an integrated fighting force capable of both offensive and defensive operations in air and space. The 2004 reform included changes in doctrine, equipment, training, education, organizational structure, and strategic thinking.

By 2005, PLAAF was in the process of modernizing force composition by retiring obsolete aircraft. The antiquated Shenyang J-6 fighters were completely phased out of the service, and the more competent Chengdu J-7 and Shenyang J-8 platforms were partially retired with the remaining fleet upgraded with improved technologies. The number of second and third-generation aircraft was reduced to about 1,000 planes. Fighters of foreign and domestic origin with modern avionics and missiles began to enter the service more rapidly. From 2000 to 2004, PLAAF incorporated 95 home-built Shenyang J-11A with license, acquired 76 Sukhoi Su-30MKK and 24 Su-30MK2 from Russia with improved composite material, weapons, and avionics akin to Sukhoi Su-35, and negotiated the purchase of 38 Ilyushin Il-76 and Ilyushin Il-78 transport/tanker aircraft. To replace the antiquated Nanchang Q-5 attacker, PLAAF introduced fighter-bomber Xi'an JH-7A with precision strike capabilities. The homegrown Chengdu J-10 platform also matured into a highly capable, multirole fighter as PLAAF continued to accumulate experience in operating modern aircraft since the 1990s.  By the mid-2000s, PLAAF had grown familiar with precision-guided munitions, aerial refueling, AEW&C aircraft, and networked command&control systems. 

Several uncertainties troubled the PLAAF leadership, including China's inability to produce advanced jet engines, the lack of bombers to conduct long-range strike missions, and the dilemma between procuring foreign designs or supporting the homegrown defense industry that could only produce less capable ones. Thus, generous resources were devoted to research and development, with every possible approach, including purchase, license, technology transfer, reverse-engineering, and intelligence gathering to absorb foreign technology and build up the domestic defense industry. New home-built airframes emerged in the late 2000s, including CAIC Z-10 attack helicopter and KJ-2000 airborne early warning & control aircraft in 2003, Shenyang J-11B air superiority fighter in 2006, Shaanxi Y-9 medium airlifter and Shenyang J-15 carrier-born fighter in 2009, and Chengdu J-20 fifth-generation stealth fighter in 2010. Other crucial aviation technologies that support the airframes, such as turbofan engines, advanced aerospace materials, full authority digital engine control (FADEC), integrated avionics, missile technologies, active electronically scanned array (AESA) radar, saw substantial progress in this decade.

2010s

In the 2010s, PLAAF began to transform expeditiously and emerged as one of the significant competitors in airpower. According to the US Air Force’s National Air and Space Intelligence Center, PLAAF was projected to become one of the most capable air forces in 2020. PLAAF improved capabilities in several areas, including fighters, advanced missiles, early warning systems, and air defense systems; the force also started major reforms in training and doctrines. PLAAF leadership realized the force was insufficient to counter US intervene in the Taiwan strait confrontations, thus invested heavily in a wider range of conventional capabilities to transition the PLAAF from a large, technologically inferior force to hold advantageous positions in both quality and quantity at its own geopolitical theater. 

In 2013, it was estimated that China had 400 modern fighters in the fourth-generation class, and the number of fourth-generation aircraft was projected to increase further with improvements in training and force compositions. According to a 2015 Pentagon report, PLAAF had approximately 600 modern aircraft and phased out more outdated platforms. The percentage of fourth-generation fighters raised from 30 percent in 2010 to 50 percent in 2015, projecting a majority fourth-generation force structure in the near future. The PLAAF also focused on developing long-range strike options with improved bomber platforms based on Xian H-6K, long-range cruise missiles, as well as fielding more multirole aircraft such as Shenyang J-16. In 2014, the Pentagon noted PLAAF was rapidly closing the gap in its training, equipment, and power projection capabilities with the United States.

From 2014 to 2016, PLAAF intensified its joint operation effort with the PLA Navy, building up power projection and expeditionary strike capabilities with other service branches, and engaged in joint patrol missions with PLA Navy in East and South China Sea. In 2015, PLA separated PLA Ground Force headquarters from the senior position, putting all service branches in the same echelon, thus ending the tradition of Army domination in PLA's command structure. A joint command structure under the newly reformed theater commands was established, improving inter-service support, command and control efficiency, and cross-service warfighting capability. In 2016, PLA established People's Liberation Army Strategic Support Force, which stripped PLAAF's responsibilities in space and information domain, leaving the air force focused on air operations, air defense, electronic warfare, airborne early warning, and air-to-ground surface strike missions. At the same time, PLAAF actively developed one of the most sophisticated integrated air defense systems, capable of providing air defense coverage beyond the coastline and borders. In the same year, PLAAF general Ma Xiaotian announced that China was developing a new type of long-range bomber on the air force's open day, which is later coined as the Xian H-20 stealth bomber. 

After the reform, analysts noted PLAAF's joint operation and integrated fighting capabilities were considerably improved. In March 2017, PLAAF incorporated Chengdu J-20 stealth fighter into service and formed the first combat unit in February 2018, making China the second country in the world and the first in Asia to field an operational stealth aircraft. Around the same time, PLAAF introduced PL-10 and PL-15 missiles to noticeably improved the PLAAF's air combat capability. By 2019, aviation researchers believed that Chinese weapon platforms have reached approximate parity with Western equivalents, and surpassed Russia in most aspects of aviation technology development and implementation. In 2019 and 2020, PLAAF began to reform its pilot curriculum and transitional training programs, inducting advanced jet trainers and active-service fighters at dedicated training academies, ending the traditional practice of training pilot at operational units. The measure improved training efficiency and prevented distraction to the defense responsibilities of the active units.

According to International Institute for Strategic Studies, PLAAF had an unprecedented military build-up between 2016 and 2022. The force successfully closed the gap with the West due to improved domestic production, introducing indigenously developed airframes, composite materials, turbofan engines, advanced avionics, and weapon systems. In six years, PLAAF incorporated over 600 fourth- and fifth-generation aircraft in more than 19 frontline combat brigades. The modern Chengdu J-10C, Shenyang J-16, and Chengdu J-20 are all equipped with AESA radar systems, domestic WS-10 engines, standoff weapons, and long-range air-to-air missiles. PLAAF also made substantial progress with larger aircraft design and production in the form of Xian Y-20 and WS-20 engines. In 2021, PLAAF announced the force had achieved the status of "Strategic Air Force". Though the self-claimed designation wasn't universally agreed upon, many analysts acknowledged the rapid modernization progress. According to the Air University assessment in 2022, PLAAF was adjudged a strategic air force with the capabilities of long-distance power protection, maintaining combat readiness, and conducting global operations to protect Chinese interests. In 2023, PLAAF planned to decommission all older Chengdu J-7 and Shenyang J-8 platforms, which completed the PLAAF's transition to an air fleet composed of only fourth-generation and fifth-generation combat aircraft.

Personnel

Ranks and insignia

See Ranks of the People's Liberation Army or the article on an individual rank for details on the evolution of rank and insignia in the PLAAF. This article primarily covers the existing ranks and insignia.

The markings of the PLAAF are a red star in front of a red band, very similar to the insignia of the Russian Air Force. The Red star contains the Chinese characters for eight and one, representing August 1, 1927, the date of the formation of the PLA. PLAAF aircraft carry these markings on the fins as well.

Commanders
 Liu Yalou (October 1949 – May 1965)
 Wu Faxian (May 1965 – September 1971)
 Ma Ning (May 1973 – February 1977)
 Zhang Tingfa (April 1977 – July 1985) 
 Wang Hai (July 1985 – November 1992)
 Cao Shuangming (November 1992 – October 1994)
 Yu Zhenwu (October 1994 – November 1996)
 Liu Shunyao (November 1996 – May 2002)
 Qiao Qingchen (May 2002 – September 2007)
 Xu Qiliang (September 2007 – October 2012)
 Ma Xiaotian (October 2012 – August 2017)
 Ding Laihang (August 2017 – September 2021)
 Chang Dingqiu (September 2021 – present)

Structure

Headquarters 
The highest leadership organization is PLAAF Headquarters (PLAAF HQ). PLAAF HQ's peacetime responsibilities are force generation, modernization, and operational control of some units like the Airborne Corps and the 34th Air Transport Division. PLAAF HQ contains four first-level departments: the Staff (formerly Headquarters), Political Work (formerly Political), Logistics, and Equipment Department.

The Staff Department manages the PLAAF organizational structure, personnel management, intelligence, communications, air traffic control, weather support, development of air force military theory, and air force education and safety. The Staff Department is lead by the chief of staff who is the "principal organizer and coordinator of military operations." The Staff Department's chief of staff has a number of deputy chiefs of staff. Previously known as the Headquarters Department, the post-2016 Staff Department maintains a number of subordinate bureaus including the Operations Bureau, Information and Communications Bureau, Training Bureau, Ground-based Air Defense Bureau, Air Traffic Control Bureau, Pilot Recruitment Bureau, Flight Safety Bureau, Test Flight Bureau, Aviation Bureau, Confidential Bureau, Unit Management Bureau, and Planning and Organization Bureau.

The Political Work Department, sometimes abbreviated PWD, is responsible for managing propaganda, security, political education, personnel records, civil-military relations, party discipline, party organizations within the PLAAF, and cultural activities to include song and dance troupes or public events. The Political Work Department is led by a director and at least two deputy directors. Subordinate to the department include bureaus such as a Cadre Bureau, Propaganda Bureau, and a Soldier and Civilian Personnel Bureau.

The Logistics Department (led by a director and political commissar, oversee the PLAAF's logistics to include transportation, materials, supplies, finance, medical care, and petroleum, oil and lubricants (POL). Since the 2016 reform, subordinate bureaus include a Finance Bureau, Transport and Delivery Bureau, Procurement and Supply Bureau, Air Force National Defense Engineering Development Command Bureau, Real Estate Management Bureau, Ordnance General-use Equipment Bureau, Military Facilities Construction Bureau, Combat Service Planning Bureau, Materials Bureau, and Audit Bureau.

The Equipment Department, originally the Air Force Engineering Department, manages the PLAAF's cradle-to-death lifecycle including repair and maintenance of the branch's weapons systems and instruments. Led by a director and political commissar, the department leads bureaus to include the Comprehensive Planning Bureau, Airfield Support Bureau, Scientific Research and Procurement Bureau, Major Type/Model Bureau, Project Management Bureau, Equipment Purchasing Bureau, Testing and Inspection Bureau, Armament General-use Equipment Bureau, Flight Safety Bureau, and Aviation Equipment Bureau.

Commands 
Below PLAAF HQ are five Theater Command Air Forces (TCAF), successors of Military Region Air Forces (MRAFs) prior to 2016.

Before 2003, MRAF had subordinate air corps and Bases which exercised direct control over units in their area of responsibility (AOR); MRAF only directly controlled fighter and ground attack divisions in the same province as MRAF headquarters (MRAF HQ). From 2004, leadership of units was consolidated in MRAF HQ, with air corps and Bases downgraded to command posts that acted on behalf of MRAF HQ. From 2012 onwards, the command posts were mostly replaced by Bases that exercised command and control over units (brigades) in their AOR and conducted joint exercises.

Below TCAF/MRAF and the air corps/command posts/Bases are corps, division, brigade, and regimental level units.

The first divisions in the 1950s was organized into a HQ and two or three regiments. In 1953, this was standardized to three regiments per division, including one training regiment. Regiments had three or four flight groups, each in turn made of three or four squadrons. Between 1964 and 1970, regiments were called groups. In the late 1980s, operational squadrons lost their training regiments. By 2010, many divisions had only two regiments. In 2019, the bomber, transport, and specialized divisions had not been reorganized into brigades and remained under the control of PLAAF HQ and TCAF headquarters.

Beginning in 2011, and in a similar process as the PLAGF, the PLAAF dissolved the majority of its air division headquarters changing previously subordinate air regiments to brigades and subordinating them directly under military region (now theater command) air forces. Brigades contain several subordinate flight groups; a flight group has one type of aircraft. All fighter and ground attack divisions and regiments were reorganized into air force brigades, organized into a brigade HQ and the flight groups organized under it.

Everything from battalions to squads are considered subunits.

Order of battle 

 PLAAF Headquarters
 Staff Department
 Political Work Department
 Logistics Department
 Equipment Department
 Directly-reporting units
 Experimental Training Base
 Flight Test Training Base
 Research Institute
 Airborne Training Base
 Command Academy
 Engineering University
 Aviation University
 Early Warning Academy
 Harbin Flight Academy
 Shijiazhuang Flight Academy
 Xi'an Flight Academy
 Medical University
 Service Academy
 Communications Sergeants Academy
 66th Blue Brigade
 Eastern Theater Command Air Force
 Southern Theater Command Air Force
 Western Theater Command Air Force
 Northern Theater Command Air Force
 Central Theater Command Air Force

Airbases 
The PLAAF has over 150 air bases distributed across each theater command.

Aerobatic display team
The August 1st (aerobatic team) is the first PLAAF aerobatics team. It was formed in 1962. Aircraft inventory of PLAAF August  Aerobatic Team includes the J-10 and it has previously flown the JJ-5 and J-7. The Sky Wing and Red Falcon air demonstration teams, which operate Nanchang CJ-6 and Hongdu JL-8 respectively, were established in 2011.

Equipment 

The People's Liberation Army Air Force operates a large and varied fleet of some 4,000 aircraft, of which around 2,300 are combat aircraft (fighter, attack, and bombers). According to FlightGlobal, China has the second largest active combat aircraft fleet and the third largest total aircraft fleet in the world.

According to the International Institute for Strategic Studies, PLAAF combat pilots acquire an average of 100-150 flying hours per year. For a list of aircraft no longer flown by the People's Liberation Army Air Force, see; List of historic aircraft of the People's Liberation Army Air Force.

Current inventory

Air defense
The People's Liberation Army Air Force operates a multi-layered, integrated air defense system combining radar stations, electronic warfare systems, early warning and surveillance zones, and air-missile defense systems of various ranges.

Chinese air defense systems are highly distributed and mobile, in order to improve survivability against SEAD missions.

See also
 List of historic aircraft of the People's Liberation Army Air Force
 People's Liberation Army Naval Air Force
 People's Liberation Army Ground Force
 List of aircraft produced by China
 List of Chinese aircraft engines
 People's Liberation Army Air Force Airborne Corps

References

Citations

Sources 

 
 Library of Congress, Federal Research Division, A Country Study: China, 1987

Further reading 
 Andreas Rupprecht and Tom Cooper: Modern Chinese Warplanes, Combat Aircraft and Units of the Chinese Air Force and Naval Aviation, Harpia Publishing (2012), 
 Gordon, Yefim and Komissarov, Dmitry. Chinese Aircraft. Hikoki Publications. Manchester. 2008.

External links 

 Articles on the Chinese military, from Sinodefence.com
 Chinese Air Power
 Regional Capability Growth on APA
 The Sleeping Giant Awakens (Australian Aviation)
 PLA Airbase Page on APA
 PLA idag-PLAAF (Swedish)
 USAF Air University, The PLAAF in 2010

 
3
Military units and formations established in 1949
1949 establishments in China